Wim de Ruyter (11 November 1918 – 21 November 1995) was a Dutch racing cyclist. He rode in the 1948 and 1949 Tour de France.

References

External links
 

1918 births
1995 deaths
Dutch male cyclists
Sportspeople from Maassluis
Cyclists from South Holland
20th-century Dutch people